BethAnn Bonner (born October 22, 1982) is an American actress. She is known for her role as Talia Sahid on One Life to Live (December 21, 2006 – April 22, 2009) and for her most recent role as Kat on All My Children (November – December 21, 2009).

Career
Bonner competed in SOAPnet's I Wanna Be a Soap Star 3 in 2006. While she did not win, later that year she was offered the contract role of police officer Talia Sahid on the ABC daytime soap opera One Life to Live. Bonner portrayed the role from December 21, 2006 to April 22, 2009.

In early 2009, Bonner appeared on the CBS soap opera Guiding Light.

In November 2009, she joined the cast of ABC's All My Children in the role of a newly created character named Kat. It was said in a December 2009 issue of Soap Opera Digest, "They're Back!" (vol. 34, No. 51, last air date shown in Comings and Goings p. 17) that Bonner's last air date is December 21, 2009. In 2010 she starred in the ABC Daytime & SOAPnet Salute Broadway Cares at The Town Hall (New York City); a benefit concert with a live symphony orchestra that raised money for the nonprofit organization Broadway Cares/Equity Fights AIDS.

Filmography

Personal life
Bonner is originally from Stillwater, Oklahoma where her parents live. She has two sisters, one in Chicago and one in Washington, D.C.

Bonner graduated from Emerson Performing Arts College in Boston, Massachusetts.

She married Maria Fuenmayor in October 2012 and they welcomed twins, Ruby Colette & Simon Lucas on September 22, 2015.

References

External links

American soap opera actresses
Living people
1982 births
Reality casting show winners
21st-century American women